Mara Brawer (born 16 May 1962) is an Argentine psychologist and politician, currently serving as National Deputy elected in the Federal Capital since 2019. She had previously served in the same position from 2011 to 2015.  A member of the Justicialist Party, Brawer sits in the Frente de Todos bloc.

Brawer has also served as Undersecretary of Education in the Government of the Buenos Aires City from 2006 to 2007, and as Undersecretary of Equity and Education Quality in the Ministry of Education of Argentina from 2009 to 2011.

Early life and education
Mara Brawer was born on 16 May 1962 in Buenos Aires. She is Jewish. She studied at the University of Buenos Aires Faculty of Psychology and completed a degree on mediation and conflict resolution from Universidad de Belgrano.

Political career
From 2006 to 2007, Brawer was Undersecretary of Education in the city government of Buenos Aires, in the administration of Jorge Telerman. She was later head of the Argentine Observatory on School Violence, dependent on the Ministry of Education of Argentina. In 2009, she was appointed Undersecretary of Equity and Education Quality, also within the scope of the national Ministry of Education, in the administration of Minister Alberto Sileoni.

National Deputy
At the 2011 general election, Brawer was a candidate in the Front for Victory list to the Argentine Chamber of Deputies in Buenos Aires; she was elected. During her first term, she authored Law 26.892 on coexistence and approach of social conflictivity in educational institutions. She did not run for re-election in 2015.

In 2014, Brawer was appointed secretary of women's affairs of the Buenos Aires City Justicialist Party.

Brawer ran again in the 2019 general election, this time as the 6th candidate in the Frente de Todos list. Though she was not elected, she took office in place of Victoria Donda, who resigned to become head of the National Institute Against Discrimination, Xenophobia and Racism.

Electoral history

References

External links

Profile on the official website of the Chamber of Deputies (in Spanish)

Living people
1962 births
Argentine psychologists
Argentine women psychologists
Jewish Argentine politicians
Members of the Argentine Chamber of Deputies elected in Buenos Aires
Women members of the Argentine Chamber of Deputies
Politicians from Buenos Aires
Justicialist Party politicians
University of Buenos Aires alumni
21st-century Argentine politicians
21st-century Argentine women politicians
University of Belgrano alumni